Matthias Lindner may refer to:

Matthias Lindner (German footballer) (born 1965), former football (soccer) defender
Matthias Lindner (Austrian footballer) (born 1988), football (soccer) forward
Matthias Lindner (athlete), German track and field athlete